Ernest Simoni Troshani (b. 18 October 1928) is a cardinal of the Roman Catholic Church from Albania.

He was created a cardinal in a consistory held on 19 November 2016 by Pope Francis.

Life
Ernest Simoni was born in 1928.

He entered the Franciscan seminary in 1938 while remaining there until 1948 when the Communist regime of Enver Hoxha closed the college in a wave of anti-religious sentiment and persecution. He was ordained to the priesthood on 7 April 1956.

On 24 December 1963 he was imprisoned by the Communist authorities because he celebrated a Mass in memory of assassinated President John Fitzgerald Kennedy. He was sentenced to death, but the sentence was converted into a prison term and he spent 28 years at penal labour, first in a mine and then in a sewage canal. He celebrated Mass using smuggled bread and grapes. By the late 1990s, he exercised his ministry in several Albanian villages.

On 21 September 2014 he met Pope Francis during his apostolic visit to Albania and provided the pope with his own testimony on his experiences under the Communist regime.

On 9 October 2016, Pope Francis announced that he would create Simoni a cardinal in the consistory held on 19 November of the same year. Canon 351 of the Code of Canon Law requires that all cardinals must be bishops, but Simoni was given a papal dispensation from the requirement of episcopal consecration.

At the consistory, he was assigned the titular church of Santa Maria della Scala. As of 2019, he hadn't received yet the episcopal consecration.

Honors

In 2017, he received the Golden Plate Award of the American Academy of Achievement presented at an awards ceremony in London.

References

Additional sources

External links
 
 
 
 
 Speech delivered in September 2014 during the visit of Pope Francis to Albania, Rome Reports, 17 November 2016

1928 births
Living people
Albanian cardinals
20th-century Albanian Roman Catholic priests
21st-century Albanian Roman Catholic priests
Cardinals created by Pope Francis
People from Lezhë County